"Freedom Overspill" is a 1986 song by Steve Winwood that reached number 20 on the Billboard Hot 100 pop chart. It was the second single released from his fourth solo album, Back in the High Life. It was produced by Russ Titelman and Winwood. James Hooker, Winwood's touring keyboard player and a former member of the Amazing Rhythm Aces, was credited with co-writing the song with Winwood and George Fleming.

It appeared in the 1987 Ridley Scott film Someone to Watch Over Me, as well as the 1987 film Big Shots.

Track listing 

7": Island / IS 294 United Kingdom
 "Freedom Overspill" - 4:09
 "Spanish Dancer" - 3:07

7": Island / 7-28595 United States
 "Freedom Overspill" - 4:09
 "Help Me Angel" - 5:06

12": Island / 12 IS 294 United Kingdom
 "Freedom Overspill" (Remix) - 8:30
 "Freedom Overspill" - 5:33
 "Spanish Dancer" 5:56

 Track 1 remixed by Steve Thompson and Michael Barbiero

12": Island / 0-20537 United States
 "Freedom Overspill" (Remix) - 7:30
 "Freedom Overspill" (Dub) - 6:00
 "Higher Love" (Remix) 7:45
 "Help Me Angel" - 5:06

 Tracks 1 and 2 remixed by Steve Thompson and Michael Barbiero
 Track 3 remixed by Tom Lord-Alge

Personnel 
 Steve Winwood – vocals, Hammond organ, synth bass, drum machine programming, sequencer programming
 Robbie Kilgore – synthesizer and sequencer programming
 Joe Walsh – slide guitar
 Eddie Martinez – rhythm guitar
 Jimmy Bralower – additional drum machine programming 
 Steve Ferrone – drums
 Carole Steele – percussion 
 Lewis Del Gatto – baritone and tenor saxophones
 Bob Mintzer – tenor saxophone
 George Young – alto saxophone
 Tom Malone – trombone
Randy Brecker – trumpet
 David Frank – horn arrangements

Charts

References

External links
Steve Winwood website album details
 

1986 singles
Steve Winwood songs
Songs written by Steve Winwood
1986 songs
Song recordings produced by Russ Titelman
Island Records singles